Apalta is a Chilean village, located northeast of Santa Cruz, Colchagua Province, O'Higgins Region.

Populated places in Colchagua Province